HMS Dorking was a Hunt class minesweeper of the Royal Navy from World War I.

Authorities disagree about where she was built: Colledge says Dundee Shipbuilding Company, whilst both Rupert-Jones and the Royal Navy History site say Clyde Shipbuilders.

References

External links
 Royal Navy History

 

Hunt-class minesweepers (1916)
Royal Navy ship names
1918 ships